The 2009–10 Highland Football League was competed for by 18 teams.  This is three-up on the previous season after Formartine United, Strathspey Thistle and Turriff United were voted in. Buckie Thistle won the league on 1 May 2010 after a 3–0 win over Wick Academy. Strathspey Thistle, one of the new teams, finished bottom in their first season.

Table

Results

References

Highland Football League seasons
5
Scottish